Felix Riebl (born 1 May 1981) is a singer, songwriter, and composer based in Melbourne. He is the co-founder, band leader and principal songwriter of the internationally acclaimed band The Cat Empire, who have made multi-platinum albums, and are the 2006 winner of the World Music Aria Award for their album Cities.

Outside of his work with The Cat Empire, Riebl has composed music for the Australia Day Spectacular at Darling Harbour in 2013, the 2006 Commonwealth Games in Melbourne 2006, The Dream Festival on the Yarra River in 2009, and Australia's first ever White Night in Melbourne in 2013.

Early life and family

Felix Riebl was born in Melbourne to an Austrian father and an Australian mother. He spent his childhood living in Europe before moving back to Australia when he was in his early teens. Riebl's childhood was surrounded by music: his uncle, Thomas, was a professor of viola at the Mozarteum Salzburg, and family members, including his cousin Misty who was an aspiring artist, studying at Victorian College of the Arts would regularly take him to sit amongst the Vienna Philharmonic.

Of his family, Riebl said in an interview with the Sydney Morning Herald that "My sister is a classical pianist, my brother's a singer, and dad's brother is quite a famous viola player in Austria. We listened to a lot of music and we danced a lot and sang a lot. The older I get, the realisation comes that a lot of this starts early in the family."

Riebl's younger brother, Max (1991–2022), sang and played trumpet on the song "Miserere" on The Cat Empire's second album Two Shoes.

Career

1999–2022: The Cat Empire

In 1999, Riebl co-founded The Cat Empire with Ollie McGill and Ryan Monro. He was the primary songwriter on the band's self-entitled debut album, including being the sole writer of their first single, "Hello". In addition to his role as a musician in the band, Riebl had helped produce the albums Two Shoes and Cities.

2011-present: Solo Career
In 2011 Riebl released his debut solo album Into the Rain. The album featured a number of original compositions, as well as a cover of Bruce Springsteen's "I'm on Fire", whom Riebl cites alongside Mark Knopfler and Bob Dylan as influences on the album. The album was a moderate success, peaking at No. 61 on the Australian iTunes albums chart.

In December 2015, Riebl released the four-track EP Lonely Truth, as a teaser for his second solo album. The song "Crocodiles", inspired by a trip to Timor-Leste, was released as a single in January 2016.

In January 2016, the Pilbara Project choir premiered Riebl's song-cycle based on the Pilbara.

Riebl released his second solo album Paper Doors on 2 September 2016 to positive reviews. Rolling Stone gave the album 3.5 stars out of 4, praising Riebl as "far more than the frontman for one of Australia's most enduring party bands". Paper Doors peaked at No. 46 on the ARIA Charts and at No. 31 on Australian iTunes.

In January 2017, Riebl released the tribute song "Ms Dhu" and an accompanying music video, following the release of the inquest into the death of Ms Dhu. Since 2015 Reibl has been composer and creative director for the Indigenous choral ensemble Spinifex Gum.

In July 2022, Riebl announced the forthcoming release of his third solo studio album, Everyday Amen, and title track as its lead single.

Personal life

Riebl resides in Fitzroy. Politically, he aligns himself with The Greens.

He is an ambassador for the Indigenous Literacy Foundation, alongside authors Richard Flanagan and David Malouf, and didgeridoo player William Barton. Riebl has also been actively involved in campaigning for 350.org, Market Forces, and the Australian Conservation Foundation on raising climate change awareness and action.

Discography

Albums

Extended Plays

References

External links
 

Alternative rock singers
Australian alternative rock musicians
Australian composers
Australian rock singers
Australian jazz percussionists
Living people
Australian percussionists
1981 births
20th-century Australian male singers
21st-century Australian male singers
Male jazz musicians
The Cat Empire members
Musicians from Melbourne